Tammy Solange Pustilnick Arditi (born 20 November 1986) is a Chilean lawyer and scholar who was elected as a member of the Chilean Constitutional Convention.

References

External links
 BCN Profile

Living people
1987 births
21st-century Chilean lawyers
Chilean people of Italian descent
21st-century Chilean politicians
Non-Neutral Independents politicians
University of Chile alumni
Academic staff of the Andrés Bello National University
Members of the Chilean Constitutional Convention
People from Santiago
21st-century Chilean women politicians